Dabwitso Nkhoma (born 8 July 1977) is a retired Zambian football striker.

References

1977 births
Living people
Zambian footballers
Zambia international footballers
Highlanders F.C. players
Motor Action F.C. players
Zanaco F.C. players
NAPSA Stars F.C. players
Association football forwards
Zambian expatriate footballers
Expatriate footballers in Zimbabwe
Zambian expatriate sportspeople in Zimbabwe